Bradycneme (meaning "ponderous leg") is a genus of theropod dinosaur from the Maastrichtian-age Upper Cretaceous Sânpetru Formation of the Hațeg Basin, Transylvania, Romania. The genus contains a single species, Bradycneme draculae, known only from a partial right lower leg (specimen BMNH A1588), which its original describers believed came from a giant owl.

History

In 1975, Harrison and Walker described two "bradycnemids" from Romania: B. draculae and Heptasteornis andrewsi. These specimens had initially been assigned to the supposed pelecaniform bird Elopteryx nopcsai. The specific name, draculae, is derived from Romanian , meaning "the dragon," and refers to Dracula.

Starting with Pierce Brodkorb, the specimens were soon compared to small theropod dinosaurs. Bradycneme, Elopteryx and Heptasteornis have been synonymized, split, and reassessed numerous times since then in part because of the fragmentary nature of the remains; there exist three proximal femora and three distal tibiotarsi, which may belong to one, two, or three species. Usually, at least one of them is considered to be a troodontid.

In the most recent assessments, Bradycneme and Heptasteornis were found to be the same and most likely basal members of the Tetanurae in one study, but Darren Naish did not follow the synonymy and found Heptasteornis to be an alvarezsaurid, while classifying Bradycneme as an indeterminate maniraptoran. In a 2011 classification, Tom Holtz assigned Bradycneme to the Alvarezsauridae along with Heptasteornis.

References

Bibliography 
  (1978): Catalogue of fossil birds, Part 5 (Passeriformes). Bulletin of the Florida State Museum, Biological Sciences 23(3): 139–228.
  (1998): Small theropods from the Late Cretaceous of the Hateg Basin (western Romania) - an unexpected diversity at the top of the food chain. Oryctos 1: 87–104.
  (1975): The Bradycnemidae, a new family of owls from the Upper Cretaceous of Romania. Palaeontology 18(3): 563–570. PDF fulltext
  (1992): The first record of dromaeosaurid dinosaurs (Saurischia, Theropoda) in the Maastrichtian of southern Europe: palaeobiogeographical implications. Bulletin de la Société géologique de la France 163(3): 337–343.
  (2004): Heptasteornis was no ornithomimid, troodontid, dromaeosaurid or owl: the first alvarezsaurid (Dinosauria: Theropoda) from Europe. Neues Jahrbuch für Geologie und Paläontologie - Monatshefte 7: 385–401.
  (1988): Predatory Dinosaurs of the World. New York, Simon & Schuster. 
  (1991): The dinosaurs of Transylvania. National Geographic Research and Exploration 7(2): 196–215. PDF fulltext

Alvarezsaurids
Maastrichtian life
Late Cretaceous dinosaurs of Europe
Cretaceous Romania
Fossils of Romania
Hațeg fauna
Fossil taxa described in 1975
Taxa named by Colin Harrison
Taxa named by Cyril Walker